Søren Skov (born 21 February 1954) is a Danish former professional footballer who played as a forward. Skov played for a number of clubs in Germany, Italy and Switzerland, but played most of his career for Belgian club Cercle Brugge. He has played three games for the Denmark national team.

Career
Born in Nyborg on Funen, Skov played his first years in Funen clubs Nyborg BK and Odense BK. He made his debut for the Denmark under-21 national team in June 1975. Skov played four under-21 national team games and scored one goal from to June to October 1975. In 1975, Skov moved abroad to play professionally for German club FC St. Pauli in the second-tier 2. Bundesliga Nord. He made his debut for St. Pauli in December 1975, and scored two goals in his first three games for the club. He only missed two games for the remainder of the 1975–76 2. Bundesliga season, scoring a total four goals in 19 games as St. Pauli finished 14th. In his second year at St. Pauli, Skov scored seven goals in 34 games, as St. Pauli won the 1976–77 2. Bundesliga league and was promoted into the top-flight Bundesliga championship.

Skov did not represent St. Pauli in the Bundesliga, as he subsequently moved to play for Cercle Brugge in the top-flight Belgian First Division championship. In his first season at Cercle, Skov scored three goals in 29 league games, as Cercle finished 17th of 18 teams, and were relegated to the Belgian Second Division. Skov stayed with Cercle and helped the club win the 1978–79 Second Division to bounce straight back into the First Division. In the next two seasons, Skov scored 19 goals in 62 games for Cercle. Skov's most successful season at Cercle was the 1981–82 First Division season, as he scored 23 goals in 33 games. Skov caught the eye of Danish national team coach Sepp Piontek, and Skov made his national team debut on 5 May 1982, in a 1–1 draw against Sweden. He played a further two national team games in May 1982.

In the Summer 1982, Skov moved to Italy to play for Avellino in the Serie A championship. Avellino finished 9th in the Serie A 1982–83 season. In 1983, Skov moved on to German club Hertha BSC in the 2. Bundesliga. In his two seasons at Hertha, Skov scored seven goals in 48 games. Skov ended his career with Swiss clubs FC Winterthur and FC St. Gallen.

Honours
FC St. Pauli
 2. Bundesliga Nord: 1976–77

Cercle Brugge
 Belgian Second Division: 1978–79

External links
 
 Haslund database 
 
 Cerclemuseum.be stats 

1954 births
Living people
People from Nyborg
Danish men's footballers
Association football forwards
Denmark international footballers
Serie A players
2. Bundesliga players
Belgian Pro League players
Odense Boldklub players
FC St. Pauli players
Cercle Brugge K.S.V. players
Hertha BSC players
FC St. Gallen players
FC Winterthur players
Danish expatriate men's footballers
Danish expatriate sportspeople in Germany
Expatriate footballers in Germany
Danish expatriate sportspeople in Belgium
Expatriate footballers in Belgium
Danish expatriate sportspeople in Italy
Expatriate footballers in Italy
Danish expatriate sportspeople in Switzerland
Expatriate footballers in Switzerland
Sportspeople from the Region of Southern Denmark